Infamous Scribblers: The Founding Fathers and the Rowdy Beginnings of American Journalism is a book by Eric Burns, a journalist and historian, about the American press in the country's early history. The first edition of Infamous Scribblers was published in 2006. Another edition was printed in 2007.

Background

When Infamous Scribblers was written and published, Eric Burns was a media critic and host of Fox News Watch on Fox News, having previously worked for NBC.

George Washington used the phrase "infamous scribblers" to describe the journalists of his day.

Overview

The book describes the history of early American newspapers in the colonial period, the American Revolution, and the early Republic. Burns credits journalism for shaping the early country's ideals and politics. He argues that partisan reporting and sensationalism are very old practices in the American media: they originated in and were at their worst in the era he explores. Most of the book is about the history of the journalists themselves, narrated in a lively style, within which historical analysis is woven.

Reception

The Claremont Review of Books called the book both entertaining and thoughtful. Reviewer Richard Brookhiser appreciated Burns's background as a journalist for helping him recognize and record important facts.

According to Roger Mellen writing for H-Net, Infamous Scribblers is a usable source that "does not quite meet the standards of a scholarly study". He noted the author's occasional unfamiliarity with the subject, which leads to factual errors, and problems with the book's sources. He also wrote that Burns, when he describes the early American news media as blatantly biased, fails to recognize nuances pointed out by other historians. Nevertheless, he praised the book's writing style, proclaiming Infamous Scribblers an "interesting and useful" book and a "pleasurable introduction" to the topic of early American journalism.

Publishers Weekly considered the book entertaining, mentioning the author's enthusiasm and the mixture of familiar and little-known stories, but also commented that Burns's assertions feel exaggerated at times.

The Boston Globe remarked that Burns is a "capable student", but repetitive anecdotes are "short on deep analysis".

Infamous Scribblers is "a quick, illuminating history", according to Kirkus Reviews, that suffers from a sometimes lacking style and problems in its use of quotes—ultimately "[i]mportant, informative, amusing, surprising and even cautionary", but it is "a pity it's not more gracefully told."

See also
 History of American journalism
 History of American newspapers
 Eric Burns

References

External links
 Television segment on The Daily Show (7 minutes)
 Radio segment on NPR (20 minutes)
 Television segment on C-SPAN (50 minutes)

18th century in the United States
2006 non-fiction books
History books about the United States
PublicAffairs books
Books about journalism